Asunafo South District is one of the six districts in Ahafo Region, Ghana. Originally it was formerly part of the then-larger Asunafo District in 1988, until the southern part of the district was split off by a decree of president John Agyekum Kufuor on 12 November 2003 (effectively 17 February 2004) to create Asunafo South District; thus the remaining part has been renamed as Asunafo North District, which it was later elevated to municipal district assembly status on 29 February 2008 to become Asunafo North Municipal District. The district assembly is located in the western part of Ahafo Region and has Kukuom as its capital town.

List of settlements

Sources
 
 District: Asunafo South District
 19 New Districts Created, November 20, 2003.

References

Districts of Ahafo Region

States and territories established in 2003